Sofiane Khabir (born 10 July 1964) is a Tunisian footballer. He played in two matches for the Tunisia national football team in 1997. He was also named in Tunisia's squad for the 1998 African Cup of Nations tournament.

References

External links
 

1964 births
Living people
Tunisian footballers
Tunisia international footballers
1998 African Cup of Nations players
Place of birth missing (living people)
Association footballers not categorized by position